"Bow Chicka Wow Wow" is a song by American recording artist Mike Posner from his debut album 31 Minutes to Takeoff (2010). The song was co-written by Posner, and produced by Cisse Methods and production teams The Smeezingtons, composed of Bruno Mars, Philip Lawrence and Ari Levine.

A remix of the song, featuring a verse by American rapper Lil Wayne, was released as the album's third single on February 3, 2011. Wayne appeared in the music video of the song as well.

Posner performed the single on The Ellen DeGeneres Show on April 19, 2011.

The song's video is listed in the showcase library of National Geographic Music India.

Music video
Posner posted the music video on Vevo on February 24, 2011. It features Lil Wayne. It takes place where Posner is dating a girl, but fails to impress her. When all else fails to work, he plays "Bow Chicka Wow Wow", and the girl becomes attracted and "turned on" to him. When Lil Wayne undergoes the same problem in the room next to Posner, he plays the song loud enough for both their girls to hear it.
The girl in the black dress at the restaurant is Lyla Dee.

Chart performance

Certifications

Release history

References

2010 songs
2011 singles
Mike Posner songs
Lil Wayne songs
Songs written by Mike Posner
Songs written by Bruno Mars
Songs written by Philip Lawrence (songwriter)
Songs written by Ari Levine
Song recordings produced by the Smeezingtons
J Records singles
Songs written by Christopher Brody Brown